The Inocybaceae are a family of fungi in the order Agaricales. Members of this family have a widespread distribution in tropical and temperate areas.

Taxonomy

The type genus of the Inocybaceae, Inocybe, had traditionally been placed within the family Cortinariaceae. Despite this, Jülich placed the genus in its own family, the Inocybaceae. Later, the Cortinariaceae were shown to be polyphyletic. Additionally, phylogenetic analyses of RPB1, RPB2 and nLSU-rDNA regions from a variety of Inocybe and related taxa would support Jülich's recognition of Inocybe at the family level. In their Dictionary of the Fungi, Kirk et al. (2008) did not distinguish between Inocybaceae and Crepidotaceae, but rather merged them into one family they called Inocybaceae. The literature has since then split up the classification given by Kirk et al. (2008) into not only Inocybaceae and Crepidotaceae, but also Tubariaceae and Chromocyphellaceae.

In a 2019 molecular study, Matheny and colleagues used six genes to determine relationships within the family. They recovered Nothocybe as sister to Inocybe, while members of Inocybe section Rimosae formed a lineage that diverged from the ancestor of the preceding two, and hence reclassified it as a genus Pseudosperma. Another branch gives rise to four lineages - the genus Auritella, what was Inocybe subgenus Mallocybe (now Mallocybe), Tubariomyces, and Inosperma (previously Inocybe subgenus Inosperma).

See also
List of Agaricales families

References

 
Agaricales families